Bernardus Valentino Telaubun (born 21 November 1984) is an Indonesian professional footballer who plays as a defender for Liga 2 club Bekasi City. On 2012, he representing and plays 2 appearance for Indonesia national team in the 2012 AFF Championship.

Club career

Semen Padang
On November 3, 2014, he was released by Semen Padang.

Persija Jakarta
On November 30, 2017, he signed a two-year contract with Persija Jakarta.

Career statistics

International

Honours

Club

Persija Jakarta
 Indonesia President's Cup: 2018

References

External links 
 
 

Indonesian footballers
Living people
1982 births
Sportspeople from Maluku (province)
Indonesia international footballers
Persiba Bantul players
PSIS Semarang players
PSIR Rembang players
Persemalra Maluku Tenggara players
Persela Lamongan players
Bontang F.C. players
Perseman Manokwari players
Persita Tangerang players
Semen Padang F.C. players
Indonesian Premier Division players
Liga 1 (Indonesia) players
Association football defenders